Per Sundberg (8 May 1949 – 3 May 2015) was a Swedish fencer. He competed in the individual foil and team épée events at the 1972 Summer Olympics.

References

External links
 

1949 births
2015 deaths
Swedish male épée fencers
Swedish male foil fencers
Olympic fencers of Sweden
Fencers at the 1972 Summer Olympics
Sportspeople from Malmö
20th-century Swedish people